Schmitz Block, also known as the Noll Block, is a historic commercial building located in downtown Fort Wayne, Indiana. It was built in 1888, and is a four-story, "L"-shaped, Richardsonian Romanesque style brick building clad entirely in cut limestone. It features round rock-faced piers which extend the full height of the building and round arch windows. It was remodeled about 1912 after bring purchased by William F. Noll.  For many years the building housed Hutner's Paris and Nobbson, a women's clothing store.

It was listed on the National Register of Historic Places in 1988.

References

Commercial buildings on the National Register of Historic Places in Indiana
Commercial buildings completed in 1888
Richardsonian Romanesque architecture in Indiana
Buildings and structures in Fort Wayne, Indiana
National Register of Historic Places in Fort Wayne, Indiana